Great Bulgarian Forest (latin: Silva Magna Bulgarica or Silvas Bulgarorum) was the territory between Belgrade and the Gate of Trajan, entering Via Militaris in Thrace. In the Middle Ages this territory was afforested with inaccessible forests and was known to all by this name. Participants in the first three crusades in the 11th-12th centuries, passing along Via Militaris, describe the famous area, which was passed in 8 days, walking 2 days and 2 nights without seeing a person. This last was the area between Nis and Pazardzhik. Usually the name Bulgarian Forest referred to the mountain hills overgrown with dense forests along the Great Morava and Nisava, including the massifs of mountain ranges in today's central parts of Eastern Serbia and Western Bulgaria.

References

See also
 Bulgaria (theme)
 Belgrad Forest

Forest history
Historical regions in Bulgaria
Historical regions in Serbia
Forests of Bulgaria